In the United Kingdom, a meal deal is a sales promotion which consists of three items, a main (often a sandwich), a drink, and a snack (commonly crisps). Meal deals are primarily eaten at lunchtime, and more than a third of Britons buy one at least once per week. 

Meal deals are sold by a variety of retailers such as supermarkets, convenience stores, cafés and bakery chains. Many retailers offer a selection of types of mains, such as pasta salads, sushi, and wraps which tend to come in a variety of toppings or fillings. Supermarkets generally offer the widest variety of meal deals, with Sainsbury's offering over 500 products in their range, and Tesco offering over 10million possible combinations. They tend to be served cold in supermarkets, but some cafés such as Costa offer hot options. Snacks offered by many retailers also include sausage rolls, pork pies, and fresh fruit.

Meal deals vary in price depending on retailer, with most costing a set price between £3 and £5. As of 2022, the average price of a meal deal (from retailers across the market) is £4.12, up from £3.91 in 2020. The price saving offered by a meal deal compared to purchasing the three items separately, can be over 50%. In 2019, a court ruled that a "free" bottle of wine included in a Marks & Spencer meal deal costing £12 is not free for the purpose of calculating alcohol duties.

Pharmacy Boots pioneered the meal deal. The meal deal is regarded as a staple in British culture, with them typically being associated with convenience and value for money, comparable to regular meal sets offered at cha chaan tengs. Sales of meal deals have grown amidst the 2021–present United Kingdom cost of living crisis, contributing to bakery chain Greggs reporting a growth in sales of nearly 15% as of October 2022.

See also
British Rail sandwich

References 

Lunch
British cuisine
Sales promotion